George Frederick Kanngieser (27 February 1912 – 27 January 1997) was an Australian rules footballer who played with Collingwood in the Victorian Football League (VFL).

Family
The son of Jonathan Anthony Kanngieser (1877-1952), and Emily Letitia Kanngieser (1880-1916), née Trinnear, George Frederick Kanngieser was born in Collingwood on 27 February 1912. He married Mary Lorrane Cario Bennet in 1937.

Football

Collingwood (VFL)
Promoted from the Second XVIII, he played his only First XVIII match for Collingwood on 24 August 1935, against Melbourne. Selected in the first ruck, in a drawn match — Collingwood 11.13 (79) to Melbourne's 10.19 (79) — "Kanngieser, for a newcomer, showed promise".

Brunswick (VFA)
He was cleared from Collingwood to Brunswick Football Club, in the Victorian Football Association (VFA) in 1937.

Preston (VFA)
Having played for Brunswick in the 1938 Grand Final, Kanngieser was cleared from Brunswick to Preston Football Club, also in the VFA, in 1939.

Notes

External links 

		
George Kanngieser's profile at Collingwood Forever
 The VFA Project: Kanngieser, George.

1912 births
1997 deaths
Australian rules footballers from Victoria (Australia)
Collingwood Football Club players
Brunswick Football Club players
Preston Football Club (VFA) players